François de Clermont-Tonnerre (1906–1979) was a French aristocrat and agrarian conservative politician.

Early life
François de Clermont-Tonnerre was born on September 19, 1906 in Paris, France. Both his father, Louis de Clermont-Tonnerre and his mother, Jeanne de Kergorlay, were aristocrats.

He graduated from the École Nationale des Chartes in Paris.

Career
He joined the French Agrarian and Peasant Party, an agrarian conservative political party He served as a member of the  Chamber of Deputies for the Somme from 1936 to 1942.

He co-authored Le manifeste paysan: essai d'une doctrine humaniste appliquée à l'agriculture française with Pierre Mathé, published in 1937.

Personal life

He married Charlotte de Rohan-Chabot. They had four children. They resided at the Château de Bertangles in Bertangles, Somme.

Death
He died on December 2, 1979 in Paris, France.

References

1906 births
1982 deaths
Politicians from Paris
French Agrarian and Peasant Party politicians
Members of the 16th Chamber of Deputies of the French Third Republic
École Nationale des Chartes alumni